Fizkin Island is an island lying  southeast of Pickwick Island and 900 m southeast of Arrowsmith Island, Pitt Islands in the Biscoe Islands, Antarctica. The island was shown on an Argentine government chart of 1957, and named by the UK Antarctic Place-Names Committee in 1959 after Horatio Fizkin, Esquire, a character in Charles Dickens' The Pickwick Papers.

See also 
 List of Antarctic and sub-Antarctic islands

References 

Islands of the Biscoe Islands